Cyril Kenneth Allen (11 January 1915 – 1985) was an English athlete who competed for England.

Athletics career
Allen won a silver medal in the 3 miles at the 1934 British Empire Games in London.

References

1915 births
1985 deaths
Commonwealth Games silver medallists for England
Commonwealth Games medallists in athletics
Athletes (track and field) at the 1934 British Empire Games
English male long-distance runners
Medallists at the 1934 British Empire Games